Mincarlo is the last surviving sidewinder fishing trawler of the Lowestoft fishing fleet. She is also the last surviving fishing vessel built in Lowestoft, with an engine made in the town.

Construction
The Mincarlo was built in the Brooke Marine yards in the Suffolk town of Lowestoft. in 1961. She was one of three sister ships built for W.H. Podd Ltd. The other two ships were called Bryher and Rosevear, and along with Mincarlo were named by the Podd family after small islands which make up part of the Isles of Scilly of the Cornish coast. Each of the vessels cost £75,600.

Sidewinder trawling method
The Mincarlo was the type of trawler known as a sidewinder or side trawler. On sidewinders, the trawl nets are deployed over the side with the trawl warps passed through blocks suspended from two gallows. These gallows were forward and aft, on the starboard side of the Mincarlo. The fishing gear consisted of two otter trawls each of which was fitted with otter boards. Otter boards are positioned in such a way that the hydrodynamic forces acting on them when the net is towed along the seabed push the boards outwards to keep the mouth of the net open. Until the late sixties, sidewinders were the most common deep sea boat used in North Atlantic fisheries. They were used for a longer period than other types of trawler.

Working life
Mincarlo was part of the 50 to 60 strong fishing fleet out of the Suffolk seaport of Lowestoft. During her 13 years her catches put her in the top half dozen trawlers of the fleet. Her catches consisted of cod, haddock, plaice, skate and sole. She had been in the ownership W. H. Podd Ltd until she was purchased from them by Putford Enterprises in 1975. At this time Putford Enterprises owned and operated a large  fishing fleet, with many vessels at Lowestoft and Grimsby. From the very early days of oil and gas exploration in the southern North Sea, Putford Enterprises along with its fishing craft, also operated many safety standby ships for the offshore oil and gas industry. In 1977 Mincarlo was converted and began a new career as a stand-by vessel in the flourishing southern North Sea gas fields. She was also renamed and was now called Putford Merlin. In 1989 after a career which had spanned 28 years, she was finally replaced by a built for purpose stand-by ship. She was laid-up, back where she began life, at the yard of Brooke's.

Restoration
After her working life had finished she was sold by Putford Enterprise to the Lydia Eva Trust Ltd who paid a nominal £1 to Putford. After a period of restoration and refurbishment the Mincarlo was opened to the public in 1998. The Mincarlo is on display at Lowestoft Heritage Quay and is sometimes moved to South Quay at Great Yarmouth. Admission is free.

Mincarlo is now owned by the Lydia Eva and Mincarlo Charitable Trust Ltd, a registered charity, which also owns the preserved herring drifter Lydia Eva.

As of January 2015 the Mincarlo is currently undergoing repairs and restoration.  The work is being undertaken free of charge by Lowestoft-based AKD Engineering as part of their 60th anniversary celebrations.

Gallery

See also
 Excelsior - last surviving Lowestoft fishing smack

References

External links
Lydia Eva and Mincarlo Charitable Trust

Museum ships in the United Kingdom
1961 ships
Fishing vessels of the United Kingdom
Museums in Suffolk
Ships and vessels on the National Register of Historic Vessels
Ships built in Lowestoft